The Tusker Football Club is a professional football club based in Nairobi, Kenya. It is the second most successful club in Kenya with thirteen Kenyan league championships. They also have four Kenyan cup titles. In addition, it has won four East African CECAFA Clubs Cup titles.

Formed in 1969, the club is sponsored by East African Breweries and its name refers to Tusker, a well-known beer brand by the company. The club was known as Kenya Breweries until 1999, when the current name was adopted. Tusker play some home games at the 15,000-capacity Kinoru Stadium in Meru.

Tusker is currently coached by Robert Matano.
Tusker F.C. played in the first ever match for the South Sudan national football team; the match was an unofficial friendly. Tusker won the match 3-1.

Tusker won the 2016 Kenyan Premier League on 6 November 2016 after beating AFC Leopards 1–0 thanks to a Shafik Batambuze strike in the 69th minute. This helped them clinch their 11th Kenyan Premier League title.

Honours
Kenyan Premier League: 13
1972, 1977, 1978, 1994, 1996, 1999, 2000, 2007, 2011, 2012, 2016, 2020–21, 2021–22

FKF President's Cup: 4
1975, 1989, 1993, 2016

Kenyan Super Cup: 3
2012, 2013 (post-season), 2021

KPL Top 8 Cup: 2
 2013, 2014

Performance in CAF competitions
CAF Champions League: 1 appearance
2022 -

Current squad

References

External links
 Official Website
 Tusker squad list for CAF Champions League
 Kenya Premier League

Kenyan Premier League clubs
Football clubs in Kenya
Sport in Nairobi
Association football clubs established in 1969
1969 establishments in Kenya
Works association football clubs in Kenya